Singapore competed in the Summer Olympic Games for the first time at the 1948 Summer Olympics in London, England, as a British Crown Colony.

Two Singaporeans, Chia Boon Leong and Chu Chee Seng, also competed for China in the football event at this Olympics.

Athletes

Key
Note–Ranks given for track events are within the athlete's heat only
Q = Qualified for the next round
q = Qualified for the next round as a fastest loser or, in field events, by position without achieving the qualifying target
NR = National record
N/A = Round not applicable for the event
Bye = Athlete not required to compete in round
NP = Not placed

Men
Field Events

References

External links 
Official Olympic Reports

Nations at the 1948 Summer Olympics
1948
Oly